Events in the year 2000 in Brazil.

Incumbents

Federal government
 President: Fernando Henrique Cardoso
 Vice President: Marco Maciel

Governors
 Acre: Jorge Viana 
 Alagoas: Ronaldo Lessa 
 Amapa: João Capiberibe
 Amazonas: Amazonino Mendes
 Bahia: César Borges 
 Ceará: Tasso Jereissati 
 Espírito Santo: José Ignácio Ferreira 
 Goiás: Marconi Perillo 
 Maranhão: Roseana Sarney
 Mato Grosso: Dante de Oliveira
 Mato Grosso do Sul: José Orcírio Miranda dos Santos
 Minas Gerais: Itamar Franco 
 Pará: Almir Gabriel 
 Paraíba: José Maranhão 
 Paraná: Jaime Lerner 
 Pernambuco: Jarbas Vasconcelos 
 Piauí: Mão Santa
 Rio de Janeiro: Anthony Garotinho
 Rio Grande do Norte: Garibaldi Alves Filho 
 Rio Grande do Sul: Olívio Dutra 
 Rondônia: José de Abreu Bianco 
 Roraima: Neudo Ribeiro Campos 
 Santa Catarina: Esperidião Amin 
 São Paulo: Mário Covas 
 Sergipe: Albano Franco 
 Tocantins: José Wilson Siqueira Campos

Vice governors
 Acre: Edison Simão Cadaxo 
 Alagoas: Geraldo Costa Sampaio 
 Amapá: Maria Dalva de Souza Figueiredo 
 Amazonas: Samuel Assayag Hanan 
 Bahia: Otto Alencar 
 Ceará: Benedito Clayton Veras Alcântara 
 Espírito Santo: Celso José Vasconcelos 
 Goiás: Alcides Rodrigues Filho 
 Maranhão: José Reinaldo Carneiro Tavares 
 Mato Grosso: José Rogério Sales 
 Mato Grosso do Sul: Moacir Kohl 
 Minas Gerais: Newton Cardoso 
 Pará: Hildegardo de Figueiredo Nunes 
 Paraíba: Antônio Roberto de Sousa Paulino 
 Paraná: Emília de Sales Belinati 
 Pernambuco: José Mendonça Bezerra Filho 
 Piauí: Osmar Ribeiro de Almeida Júnior 
 Rio de Janeiro: Benedita da Silva
 Rio Grande do Norte: Fernando Freire 
 Rio Grande do Sul: Miguel Soldatelli Rossetto 
 Rondônia: Miguel de Souza 
 Roraima: Francisco Flamarion Portela 
 Santa Catarina: Paulo Roberto Bauer
 São Paulo: Geraldo Alckmin 
 Sergipe: Benedito de Figueiredo
 Tocantins: João Lisboa da Cruz

Events

Births 
 January 16 – Brenner, footballer
 May 23 – Felipe Drugovich, racing driver
 July 12 – Vinícius Júnior, footballer
 July 15 – Paulinho, footballer

Deaths 
 April 4 – Brandãozinho, footballer, 74
 April 8 – Moacir Barbosa Nascimento, footballer, 79
 May 1 – Cláudio Christovam de Pinho, footballer, 77
 May 18 – Domingos da Guia, footballer, 87
 June 12 – Sandro Rosa do Nascimento, hijacker, 21
 July 17 – Dona Neuma, samba dancer, 78
 December 21 – Décio Esteves, footballer, 73

See also 
2000 in Brazilian football
2000 in Brazilian television
List of Brazilian films of 2000

References

 
2000s in Brazil
Years of the 20th century in Brazil
Brazil
Brazil